Sterling Lewis Morelock (June 5, 1890 – September 1, 1964) was a United States Army soldier and a recipient of the United States military's highest decoration, the Medal of Honor, for his actions in France during World War I.

Medal of Honor citation
Rank and organization: Private, U.S. Army, Company M, 28th Infantry, 1st Division. Place and date: Near Exermont, France, 4 October 1918. Entered service at: Oquawka, Ill. Birth: Silver Run, Md. G.O. No.: 43, W.D., 1922.

Citation: While his company was being held up by heavy enemy fire, Pvt. Morelock, with 3 other men who were acting as runners at company headquarters, voluntarily led them as a patrol in advance of his company's frontline through an intense rifle, artillery, and machinegun fire and penetrated a woods which formed the German frontline. Encountering a series of 5 hostile machinegun nests, containing from 1 to 5 machineguns each, with his patrol he cleaned them all out, gained and held complete mastery of the situation until the arrival of his company commander with reinforcements, even though his entire party had become casualties. He rendered first aid to the injured and evacuated them by using stretcher bearers 10 German prisoners whom he had captured. Soon thereafter his company commander was wounded and while dressing his wound Pvt. Morelock was very severely wounded in the hip, which forced his evacuation. His heroic action and devotion to duty were an inspiration to the entire regiment.

See also

List of Medal of Honor recipients
List of Medal of Honor recipients for World War I

References

External links
 

1890 births
1964 deaths
United States Army soldiers
United States Army personnel of World War I
United States Army Medal of Honor recipients
Burials at Arlington National Cemetery
World War I recipients of the Medal of Honor
Military personnel from Maryland